Kepler-41 or KOI-196 is a star in the constellation Cygnus. It is a G-type main-sequence star, like the Sun, and it is located about 3,68 light-years (1130 parsecs) away. It is fairly similar to the Sun, with 115% of its mass, a radius of 129% times that of the Sun, and a surface temperature of 5,750 K. Search for stellar companions to Kepler-41 in 2013-2014 has yielded inconclusive results, compatible with Kepler-41 being the single star.

Planetary system
In 2011, the planet Kepler-41b was discovered in orbit around the star. The planet orbits extremely close to Kepler-41, completing an orbit once every 1.86 days. Despite it receiving a high amount of radiation from Kepler-41, the radius of the Kepler-41b was initially believed to be less than that of Jupiter making it unusual for a hot Jupiter however later observations showed an inflated radius similar to other hot jupiters. Kepler-41b is also quite reflective, with a geometric albedo of 0.30.

References

G-type main-sequence stars
Planetary systems with one confirmed planet
Planetary transit variables
196
Cygnus (constellation)
J19380317+4558539